Ecco Homo is a 2015 documentary film about provocateur, artist & performer: Peter Vanessa "Troy" Davies directed by Lynn-Maree Milburn and Richard Lowenstein.

Festivals and awards 
The world premiere of Ecco Homo was at the Melbourne International Film Festival in August 2015.

External links 
 
 The Guardian - Film Review
 Sydney Morning Herald - Film Review

Australian documentary films
Films directed by Richard Lowenstein